Regina grahamii, commonly known as Graham's crayfish snake, is a species of nonvenomous semiaquatic snake in the subfamily Natricinae of the family Colubridae. The species is endemic to the central United States.

Etymology
The specific name, grahamii, is in honor of Lt. Col. James Duncan Graham, U.S. Topographical Engineers, who collected the type specimen.

Common names
Additional common names for R. grahamii include Arkansas water snake, Graham's leather snake, Graham's queen snake, Graham's snake, Graham's water snake, prairie water adder, prairie water snake, and striped moccasin.

Description
R. grahamii is a medium-sized snake, measuring an average of 18–28 inches (46–71 cm) in total length (including tail), but can grow up to almost 4 feet long in some cases. The maximum recorded total length is 47 inches (119 cm).

It is usually a brown or gray color with an occasional faint mid-dorsal stripe. Its lateral stripes are typically cream, white tan, or light yellow and located from the belly up to the fourth scale row. The belly is typically the same color as the lateral stripes and is unmarked, with the exception of a row of dark dots down the center (rare in specimens).

Subspecies
There are no subspecies of Graham's crayfish snake, Regina grahamii, which are recognized.

Habitat
Regina grahamii occurs along the margins of mud-bottom marshes, oxbow lakes, rivers and streams. It particularly likes roadside ditches abundant with crayfish. Graham's crayfish snake typically hides under rocks, logs, and other debris at the waters edge and also spend much time in crayfish burrows.

Diet
Graham's crayfish snake feeds chiefly upon crayfish, especially recently molted crayfish. It is also reported to eat fish and amphibians.

Temperament and defense
The primary defenses for this species, Regina grahamii, are camouflage and nocturnal behavior. When alarmed, especially while basking, it will make a quick escape into the water and hide. This species is relatively docile, but it may flatten out and musk if captured.

Reproduction
Adult females of R. grahamii bear live young in broods of 10–15. Each newborn is about 8 inches (about 20 cm) in total length (including tail).

In captivity
R. grahamii is difficult to keep in captivity, usually refusing all food and developing skin lesions easily. Only experienced snake owners should attempt to raise this species.

Geographic range
R. grahamii is found in Arkansas, Illinois, Iowa, Kansas, Louisiana, Mississippi, Missouri, Nebraska, Oklahoma, and Texas.

References

External links
Graham's Crayfish Snake on Reptiles and Amphibians of Iowa.

Further reading
Baird, S.F., and C. Girard (1853). Catalogue of North American Reptiles in the Museum of the Smithsonian Institution. Part I.–Serpents. Washington, District of Columbia: Smithsonian Institution. xvi + 172 pp. ("Regina Grahamii, B. & G.", new species, pp. 47–48).
Behler, John L., and F. Wayne King (1979). The Audubon Society Field Guide to North American Reptiles and Amphibians. New York, New York: Alfred A. Knopf. 743 pp. . (Regina grahami, pp. 646–647 + Plate 519).
Boulenger, G.A. (1893). Catalogue of the Snakes in the British Museum (Natural History). Volume I., Containing the Families ... Colubridæ Aglyphæ, part. London: Trustees of the British Museum (Natural History). (Taylor and Francis, printers). xiii + 448 pp. + Plates I-XXVIII. (Tropidonotus grahami, pp. 240–241).
Conant, Roger, and William Bridges (1939). What Snake Is That?: A Field Guide to the Snakes of the United States East of the Rocky Mountains. (with 108 drawings by Edmond Malnate). New York and London: D. Appleton-Century Company. Frontispiece map + viii + 163 pp. + Plates A-C, 1-32. (Natrix grahamii, p. 94 + Plate 16, figure 46).
Powell, Robert, Roger Conant, Joseph T. Collins (2016). Peterson Field Guide to Reptiles and Amphibians of Eastern and Central North America, Fourth Edition. Boston and New York: Houghton Mifflin Harcourt. xiv + 494 pp., 47 plates, 207 figures. . (Regina grahamii, p. 422 + Plate 41 + Figure 207 on p. 494).
Smith, H.M., and Edmund D. Brodie, Jr. (1982). Reptiles of North America: A Guide to Field Identification. New York, New York: Golden Press. 240 pp. . (Regina grahami, pp. 156–157).
Stejneger, Leonard, and Thomas Barbour (1917). A Check List of North American Amphibians and Reptiles. Cambridge, Massachusetts: Harvard University Press. 125 pp. (Natrix grahamii, p. 95).

Regina (snake)
Snakes of North America
Reptiles of the United States
Endemic fauna of the United States
Fauna of the Plains-Midwest (United States)
Extant Cenozoic first appearances
Reptiles described in 1853
Taxa named by Spencer Fullerton Baird
Taxa named by Charles Frédéric Girard